Over the years, Keith Jarrett has recorded in many different settings: jazz piano trio, classical and baroque music, improvised contemporary music, solo piano, etc. Well known for his tremendous impact on the piano and jazz scene, as a composer, multi-instrumentalist, and first class improviser, Keith Jarrett's original output embraces many different musical styles (some of them did not exist before him) and spans a period of almost 50 years, comprising a generous production of more than 100 albums.

As leader or co-leader
In chronological order as they were recorded, this general list contains Jarrett's albums (CD, LP, cassette) as a leader or co-leader excluding those related to the so-called "classical music" field where he plays Bach, Pärt, Mozart, Shostakovich, etc.

First trio + American Quartet (1967–1976) 
Keith Jarrett's recording career as a leader began in 1967 with the company of Charlie Haden on double-bass and Paul Motian on drums. With the addition of Dewey Redman on tenor saxophone in 1971 (Atlantic sessions), the trio metamorphosed into a quartet which, according to different sources, didn't start working steadily until 1973. Much later, due to the emergence of a "European" (or Scandinavian) counterpart in 1974, Jarrett's American group was called the "American Quartet". 

The band's life lasted until October 1976. A few typically reliable sources, including Ian Carr's biography and Michael Cuscuna liner notes in Silence (GRP 11172, compilation album) set its last recording sessions (Byablue, Bop-Be) either in 1975 or (September) 1977, which according to Neil Tesser and the detailed credits found in Mysteries: The Impulse Years 1975-1976 is not quite accurate. The full story of the American Quartet's last sessions can be found 
here.

 First Trio: Keith Jarrett, Charlie Haden, Paul Motian
 American Quartet: Keith Jarrett, Charlie Haden, Paul Motian, Dewey Redman

(^) Live albums

Solo piano (1971–2016) 
All albums recorded live in concert except as indicated (**) 
All albums released by ECM (sometimes many years after they were performed / recorded). 

In 2008, in an interview with Ted Panken, Keith Jarrett would give arguments to his tendency to record live albums:

European Quartet (1974–1979) 
The band featuring Jan Garbarek, Palle Danielsson and Jon Christensen was known as Keith Jarrett's "European" or "Scandinavian" Quartet or even the "Belonging Band" after their debut album Belonging

All albums recorded live in concert except as indicated (**) 
All albums released by ECM Records.

Standards Trio: Jarrett / Peacock / DeJohnette (1983–2014) 
Jarrett's so-called "Standards Trio", consisting of Jarrett, Gary Peacock (1935–2020) and Jack DeJohnette (born 1942)), first performed together on Peacock's 1977 album Tales of Another, then re-grouped with Jarrett as the leader in January 1983. The trio performed their last concert in November 2014. All their albums were released by ECM Records.

All albums recorded live in concert except as indicated (**)

Orchestral works 
Original works composed, arranged and orchestrated by Keith Jarrett. Some of them involve improvisation and Jarrett does not play in some of them.

Miscellaneous works

Plays "classical" music

Video

Compilations

As sideman

With The Jazz Messengers
Buttercorn Lady (Limelight, 1966)

With Charles Lloyd 
 Dream Weaver (Atlantic, 1966)
 Forest Flower (Atlantic, 1967) – recorded in 1966
 Love-In (Atlantic, 1967)
 Montreux Jazz Festival (1967)[2CD]
 Journey Within (Atlantic, 1967)
 Charles Lloyd in Europe (Atlantic, 1968) – recorded in 1966
 Soundtrack (Atlantic, 1969) – recorded in 1968
 Charles Lloyd in the Soviet Union (Atlantic, 1970) – recorded in 1966
 The Flowering (Atlantic, 1971) – recorded in 1966
 Live... 1966 (Hi Hat, 2018)[2CD] – recorded in  1966

With Miles Davis 
 Miles Davis at Fillmore (1970) –  a double LP recorded on four consecutive nights at New York's Fillmore East in June 1970
 Isle of Wight (1970) – recorded live at the Isle of Wight Festival, UK, on August 29, 1970. The same material (albeit under a different name) is also included as a bonus track on the 3-CD album Munich Concert (2005) from Miles Davis
 Live-Evil (1971)
 Get Up With It (1974)
 Directions (1981) – a release of previously unavailable recordings, Keith Jarrett only features on one song
 The Columbia Years: 1955–1985 (1990) – mainly a collection of previously issued recordings, Keith Jarrett only features on two songs, taken from Live-Evil and Get Up With It, respectively
 What I say? Volume 2 (1994) – recorded live at the Fillmore West, October 17, 1970
 Another Bitches Brew (1995) - Two concerts in Belgrade November 3, 1971 and November 7, 1973, the earlier one featuring Keith Jarrett
 The Miles Davis Story (2001) – a movie documentary on Miles Davis which features very very briefly Keith Jarrett
 The complete Jack Johnson Sessions (2003) – recordings from 1969 and 1970, featuring Keith Jarrett on 3 of the 5 CDs included in the box
 Miles Electric: A Different Kind of Blue (2004) – a 1970 performance at the Isle of Wight festival, released on DVD
 The Cellar Door Sessions 1970 (2005) – complete recordings of the live sessions that produced the live segments of Live-Evil
 Bitches Brew Live (2011) – organ, for 1970 Isle of Wight performance
 Miles at the Fillmore – Miles Davis 1970: The Bootleg Series Vol. 3 (2014) – complete recordings of the live sessions that produced Miles Davis at Fillmore
 Miles Davis at Newport 1955–1975: The Bootleg Series Vol. 4 (2015) – includes one complete concert from the 1971 European fall tour.
 Bitches Brew 40th Anniversary Edition (2015) – includes one CD with a live concert at Tanglewood from 1970, featuring Keith Jarrett

With others 
 Don Jacoby, Swinging Big Sound (Decca, 1962)
 Bob Moses, Love Animal (Amulet, 1968)
 Marion Williams, Standing Here Wondering Which Way to Go (Atlantic, 1971)
 Barbara & Ernie, Prelude To... (Cotillion, 1971) – 1 track "Satisfied"
 Donal Leace, Donal Leace (Atlantic, 1972)
 Airto Moreira, Free (CTI, 1972)
 Freddie Hubbard, Sky Dive (CTI, 1973) – recorded in 1972
 Paul Motian, Conception Vessel (ECM, 1973) – recorded in 1972
 Kenny Wheeler, Gnu High (ECM, 1976) – recorded in 1975
 Charlie Haden, Closeness (Horizon, 1976)
 Gary Peacock, Tales of Another (ECM, 1977)
 Scott Jarrett, Without Rhyme or Reason (Arista, 1980) – his younger brother

Sources 
 Keith Jarrett entry on ECM Records 
 Keith Jarrett past concerts on keithjarrett.org 
 Keith Jarrett sessions at jazzdisco.org 
 Keith Jarrett entry at discogs.com

References 

 
Jazz discographies
Discographies of American artists